Scott Perras (born October 25, 1983 in Regina, Saskatchewan) is a former Canadian biathlete. He competed for Canada at the 2014 Winter Olympics.

References 

1983 births
Living people
Olympic biathletes of Canada
Biathletes at the 2014 Winter Olympics
Canadian male biathletes
Sportspeople from Regina, Saskatchewan